Christoph Lanz (born 1959) is a journalist, media specialist and strategic adviser in media development for both national and international clients.

Life 
Lanz was born in Darmstadt. He serves as Trustee for the Thomson Foundation, UK and is Head of the Board of Thomson Media Germany, gGmbH.He has started in journalism in the early 80s as a reporter and editor for Suedwestfunk (SWF) a member of ARD (broadcaster), Germany's nationwide public service broadcasting cooperation. Christoph Lanz has also worked for various television and radio stations including SWF and NDR and was freelancing correspondent in New York, New York for various ARD stations and RTL, Luxembourg.1985 to 1989 he worked for RIAS, Rundfunk im amerikanischen Sektor radio-station in various positions. In 1987 Lanz was co-organizer of the RIAS, Rundfunk im amerikanischen Sektor, radio broadcast and emcee of the "Concert for Berlin" at the Reichstag. In the course of this three-day concert there were conflicts between East German youths and the Volkspolizei (GDR People's Police) at the Berlin Wall around the Brandenburg Gate with hundreds of arrests. For the first time there were also calls to be heard like "Gorbi, Gorbi" and "The Wall must go!”In the early 90s, Christoph Lanz moved to RIAS Berlin television branch, where, two years later he became Editor-in-Chief. After the political upheaval with the fall of the Wall in Germany and the ensuing disbandment of RIAS TV, Deutsche Welle (Germanys International Broadcasting Service) took over the entity.  As Editor-in-Chief Christoph Lanz was responsible for the launch of DW-TV, the German global television service.Christoph Lanz was appointed Director of Television at Deutsche Welle in 2002. During his twelve years as Deutsche Welle's TV- and Multimedia-Director he was responsible for the launch of the Arabic television service and a Hispanic television program. In this capacity, he interviewed among other heads of state Pope Benedict XVI.Christoph is an honorary fellow of the University of Melbourne and member of the board of the M100 Sanssouci Colloquium in Potsdam, Germany. He is also deputy chairman of the association “Förderverein Gedenkstätte Berliner Mauer” which supports the Berlin Wall Foundation.

Awards

RIAS Berlin Commission Award
2010 Christoph Lanz and Max Hofmann received the RIAS Berlin Commission New Media Award for their documentary "Eingemauert" or "Walled In". This production is an animated reconstruction of the Berlin Wall and the inner German border and was published on the occasion of the 20th anniversary of the Fall of the Berlin Wall.

References

External links
  
  
  
  
  
  
  

1959 births
Living people
German broadcast news analysts
German male journalists
German male writers
German opinion journalists
German radio journalists
German television reporters and correspondents
German television presenters
20th-century German journalists
21st-century German journalists
Writers from Darmstadt